The Ministry of Agriculture, a ministry of the Government of Maharashtra, is the apex body for formulation and administration of the rules and regulations and laws related to agriculture in the state of Maharashtra.

Head office

List of Cabinet Ministers

List of Ministers of State

List of Principal Secretary

History
Department of agriculture was established in 1883 after recommendation of Famine Commission(1881). Varies hybrid varieties of crops were deployed in 1965-66 which laid down the foundation of Green Revolution.

Structure
Agriculture section has three different ministers and divisions. 
 Dadaji Bhuse, Minister of Agriculture
 Sandipanrao Bhumre, Minister of Horticulture 
 Shankarrao Gadakh, Minister of Soil and Water Conservation

International Partnerships
Ministry signed an MoU with United States Department of Agriculture in June 2021 for better collaboration between United States of America and Government of Maharashtra.

References

Government ministries of Maharashtra
Agricultural organizations
Maharashtra